Tongaren is an electoral constituency in Kenya. Tongaren constituency politically came into existence in 2012 prior to the 2013 general election. The constituency was carved off from the then larger Kimilili Constituency. It is one of the 290 constituencies in Kenya and one of the 9  constituencies in Bungoma County. The Independent Electoral and Boundaries Commission (IEBC) registered 84,952 voters in Tongaren constituency for the August 9th 2022 general election in Kenya.

Members of National Assembly

County Assembly Wards

References 

Constituencies in Bungoma County